S̲h̲āhbandar, was an official of the ports in Safavid Persia and one also known on other shores of the Indian Ocean. The Shahbandar (Port Master) was in charge of the traders and the collection of taxes.

The office of shahbandar first appeared in Persia, and from there spread throughout the Indian Ocean basin.

Later on, having become obsolete for the port towns of Persia, the term shahbandar was now used for the official who represented the interests of the Turkish merchants operating within Persia.

Malacca Sultanate
During the time of the Malacca Sultanate, four Shahbandars oversaw different communities in the port of Malacca: the Gujarati traders; the traders from Southern India, Bengal, Burma, and Pasai; traders from Maritime Southeast Asia; and traders from Annam, China, and Ryukyu. The Shahbandars of Malacca's ranks were below those of the Laksamana (admiral) and the Temenggung (chief of public security).

See also
 Shahbandar (Pakistan)

References

Further reading
 

Nautical terminology
Marine occupations
Maritime history
Government of Safavid Iran
Malay culture
Persian words and phrases